"Slide" is a song by Scottish musician Calvin Harris featuring  American musicians Frank Ocean and Migos as the lead single from the formers fifth studio album, Funk Wav Bounces Vol. 1, released on 23 February 2017 through Sony Music.

Background
The Harris-produced song was announced on 21 February 2017, and its release came just two days later, with Quavo and Offset being billed under the Migos name. It is the first collaboration between any of the three acts, as well as Ocean's first collaboration as an independent artist, as Harris' liner notes of "Slide" list Ocean as appearing courtesy of himself.

Composition
"Slide" is a "sultry, piano-tipped grooving" nu-disco song that combines hip hop and dance music. Its production features "handclapped-styled beats and pitched background vocals", and has elements of funk, R&B, and pop. Fact has described the songwriting of "Slide" as "pop songwriting". The song begins with the verses sung by Ocean in a distorted voice: "I might/Empty my bank account/And buy that Boy with a Pipe." Referring to the lyric, Ocean explains that it is an allusion to: "A Picasso painting that sold for so much money." The Picasso in question is Garçon à la pipe, painted during the artist's Rose Period, which was auctioned off for $104 million at Sotheby's in 2004. Elsewhere in the song, Migos' Offset raps, "Swallow the bottle while I sit back and smoke gelato/ Walk in my mansion 20 thousand paintin' Picasso/ Bitches be dippin', dabbin' with niggas like a nacho/ Take off her panties, diamonds dancin' like Rick Ricardo."

Reception
"Slide" received mostly positive reviews. Ryan Dombal of Pitchfork gave it the title of "Best New Track", writing that "[Frank Ocean's] deadpan instantly adds shade and nuance to the dayglo surroundings, suggesting a weariness big pop rarely allows. The effect is magnetic and a little startling, like Jeff Tweedy rapping over a Dr. Dre beat". He adds that "Migos' Quavo and Offset, known for twisting tongues over dank trap, come off like a winning insurance plan as they adapt to this more traditional pop showcase with ease."

Spencer Kornhaber of The Atlantic gave it a mixed to positive review, saying that "the divides between Ocean, Migos, and Harris's sensibilities couldn't be clearer, but the song is a reminder of pop's power to make very different elements slide together", and concluding that Frank Ocean's "team-up with Calvin Harris and Migos on 'Slide', scrambles some expectations, but mostly just sounds like summer".

Las Vegas Review-Journal published that "'Slide' carries a mixture of the depth and warmth of analog instrumentation alongside modern vocal production, arrangement and mixing and showcases Calvin's music abilities and prowess to the best".

Credits and personnel
Credits adopted from Tidal

Calvin Harris – production, Yamaha C7 Piano, Sequential Circuits Prophet 5, Fender Rhodes, Gibson SG Custom, Ibanez 1200 Bass, Linn LM-2, Roland TR-808, PPG Wave 2.2, Roland Jupiter-8, mixing
Frank Ocean – vocals
Migos – vocals
Mike Marsh – mastering

Charts

Weekly charts

Year-end charts

Certifications

Release history

References

2017 songs
2017 singles
Calvin Harris songs
Frank Ocean songs
Migos songs
Songs written by Calvin Harris
Songs written by Frank Ocean
Songs written by Quavo
Songs written by Offset (rapper)
Sony Music singles